Demiivka is a neighborhood located in the Holosiiv Raion (district) of Kyiv, the capital of Ukraine. It is located towards the southern part of the city, in between the city's neighborhoods Chorna Hora, Shyrma, and Holosiiv National Park. Through the neighborhood flows Lybid River and the unofficial name of the neighborhood Nyzhnia Lybid (Lower Lybid). At its eastern edge is located a ridgeline of Kyiv Hills consisting of Lysa Hora, Chorna Hora, and Bahrynova Hora, past which is located Dnipro.

Until the 19th century the area was outside of the Kyiv city and was known as Lybidska zemlya (land of Lybid) which had couple of small villages (sloboda) Verkhnyolybidske and Nyzhnyolybidske. The current name the place assumed sometime in the second half of the 19th century as Demiivka of Khotiv volost. In 1909 the Kyiv entrepreneur David Margolin opened in Demiivka a private city tramway company. In 1918 it was included into Kyiv and in 1920s through 1960s carried the name of Stalinka. Under such name, the neighborhood is mentioned in the work of Ukrainian writer Oles Ulianenko, "Stalinka", which received the junior Shevchenko National Prize (existed in 1997–1999). Most of its older building were demolished already in 1970s.

The Kyiv Central Bus Station and Vernadsky National Library of Ukraine are located in the neighborhood. Demiivka is served by a Holosiivska and Demiivska metro stations of the Kyiv Metro's Obolonsko–Teremkivska line. The Kyiv Metro in the area was opened in 2010. Beside Kyiv underground rail transport, there is also a regular train station Kyiv-Demiivskyi. Through the neighborhood passes the European route E95.

The Demiivska Square is an important intersection through which passes the E95 route and some major streets that lead to the Pivdennyi Bridge (Southern bridge, part of the European route E40).

Across from the National Library is located a building of the Holosiivskyi District State Administration.

The neighbor is also home to number of older Kyiv industries among which are Kyiv Brewing Factory #1 (Soviet name for former Carl Schultz Brewery), Kyiv Roshen Factory (former Demiivka Sugar Factory), Factory "Kyivhuma" (Kyiv Rubber), Kyiv Artillery Shells Factory, and others.

References

Neighborhoods in Kyiv
Holosiivskyi District